The Spy Machine is a UK documentary special about the work of the Mossad, written and narrated by Gordon Thomas. 

It was made by Open Media and Israfilm and first broadcast by Channel 4 in May 1998. The producer/director was Per-Eric Hawthorne.

Reception 

The Observer said:

The Times described the film:

...and also wrote:

The Belfast News Letter said this was the first time ever that Rafael "Rafi" Eitan, legendary first director of operations, was captured on film and went on to claim 

The newspaper quoted Channel 4 executive David Lloyd:

References 

Channel 4 original programming
1998 television specials
Works about the Mossad
British television documentaries